H4, H04, or H-4 may refer to:

Science and mathematics
 ATC code H04 Pancreatic hormones, a subgroup of the Anatomical Therapeutic Chemical Classification System
 Histamine H4 receptor, a human gene
 Histone H4, a protein involved in the structure of chromatin in eukaryotic cells
 Hydrogen-4 (H-4), an isotope of hydrogen
 H4, a symmetry group in the fifth dimension.

Technology
 H-4 SOW, a precision-guided glide bomb used by the Pakistan Air Force
 Halo 4, a video game created by 343 Industries for the Xbox 360
 Harrison Number Four, an 18th-century marine chronometer designed by John Harrison
 Zoom H4 Handy Recorder, a handheld digital audio recorder
 , level 4 heading markup for HTML Web pages, see HTML element#heading

Transport

Automobiles and roads
 H4, a halogen headlamp bulb
 H4, development name of the Hummer HX concept car
 H-4, shorthand for a 4-cylinder horizontally-opposed or "flat four" engine (not to be confused with an actual H engine)
 H4 Dansteed Way, a road in Milton Keynes, England

Aviation
 GEN H-4, a Japanese helicopter design
 Hughes H-4 Hercules (Spruce Goose), the largest flying boat ever built
 H4, IATA code for Héli Sécurité Helicopter Airlines, based in France
 H4, IATA code for Inter Islands Airlines, based in Cape Verde

Ships and submarines
 HMS H4, a 1915 British Royal Navy H-class submarine
 HMS Tenedos (H04), a 1918 British Royal Navy Admiralty S-class destroyer
 USS H-4 (SS-147), a 1918 United States Navy submarine

Rail
 GNR Class H4, a class of British steam locomotives

Other uses
 H4 (film), a 2013 film
 H-4 visa, issued by the U.S. Citizenship and Immigration Services
 British NVC community H4, a heath community in the British National Vegetation Classification system
 H4 (classification), a cycling classification used in para-cycling
 H-4, a huge eruption of the Hekla volcano around 2310 BC
 H4, Houston Hash House Harriers, a social running club based in Houston, Texas

See also

4H (disambiguation)

HHHH